Samuel David Jenkins (born 17 February 1987) is a New Zealander former footballer.

Club career
Jenkins started off his club career for Napier City Rovers in the year 2001. He progressed through the Junior ranks to the 1st team where he made 67 appearances scoring 34 goals from Midfield.

In 2004 aged 17 whilst still at School he signed for Napier in the inaugural 2004–05 New Zealand Football Championship. He has since made over 60 appearances for Hawkes Bay in the NZFC scoring 10 goals.

In 2007, he looked at attending college in the United States while playing for an NCAA team as a student-athlete.  He took visits to Rutgers University and the University of California, Santa Barbara. He ultimately committed to enroll at UC Santa Barbara and play soccer for the UC Santa Barbara Gauchos alongside Michael Boxall, his New Zealand national under-20 football team teammate for the 2007 FIFA U-20 World Cup. He would ultimately renege on his commitment and in 2008 while based in Wellington training for the Olympics, he signed for Western Suburbs FC where he made 7 appearances scoring 9 goals.

International career
Jenkins has represented New Zealand at under-20 and under-23. His first cap for the NZ Under 20s was against Australia in Sydney in May 2006 where he scored the winning goal in a 1–0 win for New Zealand. He then scored a double two days later to help New Zealand to a 3–1 win over Australia and their first ever series win. He was third top goal scorer (4) at Oceania World Cup Qualifying tournament in January 2007 in Auckland where he helped New Zealand qualify for the 2007 FIA Under-20 World Cup in Canada. He started all three matches in Canada against Portugal (0–2), The Gambia (0–1) and Mexico (1–2) and was one of New Zealand's stand out players.

In 2008, he was called into the New Zealand under 23 Olympic team for matches against Chile in Wellington which saw New Zealand gain their first ever win (1-0) against South American opposition on home soil. He was included in the New Zealand squad for the football tournament at the Summer Olympics in Beijing becoming New Zealand Olympian 1050. He played in New Zealand's three group matches against China (1–1), Brazil (0–5) and Belgium (0–1).

Personal
Grew up in Napier, New Zealand with his family, Mum (Jude), his late father (Dave) and his younger sister Chloe. He attended Porrit Primary School, Tamatea Intermediate and Napier Boys High School where he excelled at both cricket (represented both Hawkes Bay and Central Districts while at School) and soccer.

References

External links

Sam Jenkins player profile at the NZ Soccer website 

Living people
1987 births
New Zealand association footballers
Footballers at the 2008 Summer Olympics
Olympic association footballers of New Zealand
Sportspeople from Napier, New Zealand
Hawke's Bay United FC players
Team Wellington players
Association football midfielders